The 112th Grey Cup will be played to decide the Canadian Football League (CFL) championship for the 2025 season. The game is scheduled to be played at IG Field in Winnipeg, Manitoba. It will be the fifth time that Winnipeg has hosted the Grey Cup, with the most recent being in 2015. The game will be televised in Canada nationally on TSN and RDS.

Host
In October 2022, it was reported that the Winnipeg Blue Bombers were bidding to host either the 2024 or 2025 Grey Cup game, with the Manitoba government offering to contribute up to $5.5 million for the bid. After the 2024 Grey Cup was awarded to the city of Vancouver and the BC Lions, it was later reported on March 3, 2023, that the Winnipeg Blue Bombers had won the right to host the 2025 Grey Cup. On March 14, 2023, it was officially announced that Winnipeg would be the host of this game.

Date
The date of this game was not announced, but if existing scheduling formulas are used, then this game would be played on November 16, 2025 (the third Sunday of November). If the game is played on this date, it would be tied with the 85th Grey Cup and 91st Grey Cup games as the earliest to be played in a calendar year. However, as per the latest Collective Bargaining Agreement, the league has the option of moving the start of the season up to 30 days, which could significantly alter the date of this game.

References

Grey Cup
Grey Cups hosted in Winnipeg
Grey Cup
Grey Cup
Grey Cup
2025 in Canadian television
2025 in Manitoba